Hà Kiều Anh (born 1977 in Hanoi) is a Vietnamese actress and former beauty queen.

Hà Kiều Anh was born in Hanoi but her family had origin in Thua Thien Hue province in central Vietnam. When she was 5 years old, her family relocated to Ho Chi Minh City.  She was crowned the Miss Vietnam in 1992 in Phan Dinh Phong Sports Complex in Ho Chi Minh City. After winning the Miss Vietnam pageant, she went to South Korea and joined in "Miss World University", she made the top 5 and won Miss Taejon award.

Hà Kiều Anh starred in Lục Vân Tiên (film) a 2002 Vietnamese TV film directed by Phương Điền based on a Lục Vân Tiên, a 19th-century epic poem, as the heroine Kiều Nguyệt Nga. Though some of the scenes in a bathing spring created a small scandal in Vietnam.

On June 7, 2022, it was announced that Hà Kiều Anh would assume the role of jury president of the Miss Grand Vietnam 2022 pageant. During the final night held on 1 October 2022 in Phú Thọ Indoor Stadium, District 11, Ho Chi Minh City, she unintentionally garnered the attention of the media when she tripped on the hem of her tight black dress and fell down on stage. The next day actor and co-host  told VietNamNet she was "quite tormented" by the incident and she confided to him that she felt "very embarrassed".

Miss Viet Nam 1992
The winner: Hà Kiều Anh (Hanoi)
 The first runner up: Vi Thị Đông (Hà Nội)
 The second runner up: Nguyễn Minh Phương (Tuyên Quang)

Movies
Người tình trong mơ (1992)
Đẻ mướn (2005)

References

1977 births
Living people
People from Ho Chi Minh City
Miss Vietnam winners